Sundy Wongderree (born May 27, 1998), is a Thai professional footballer who plays as an attacking midfielder.

References

External links
 

1998 births
Living people
Sundy Wongderree
Association football midfielders
Sundy Wongderree
Sundy Wongderree
Sundy Wongderree
Sundy Wongderree